Juszczyn may refer to the following places in Poland:
Juszczyn, Lower Silesian Voivodeship (south-west Poland)
Juszczyn, Lesser Poland Voivodeship (south Poland)